is a large franchise of 100-yen shops founded in Japan. The headquarters are in Higashihiroshima, Hiroshima Prefecture.

Daiso has a range of over 100,000 products, of which over 40 percent are imported goods, many of them from China, South Korea, and Japan. Many of their products are house-hold items such as kitchenware and cleaning products. Daiso has locations in 25 countries and regions worldwide.

History
Daiso was originally opened first as a street vending shop dealing with 100-yen products known as “Yano Shoten" by Hirotake Yano in 1972. He later founded Daiso in 1977.

Business method
Daiso often uses such locations as previous pachinko parlours for its retail outlets. They spend a lot of money on shelving and fixtures to help the stores compete with more high-end retailers. The stock of items retailed at each shop is varied frequently in order to increase repeat customers.

Daiso categorizes all of its own branded items on sale using the morpheme za (ザ), the Japanese representation of the English word "the", plus a category. For example, za hanabi (ザ・花火) is the category for fireworks, and za purasuchikku (ザ・プラスチック) is the category for plastic items such as plastic buckets or trays.

In 2004, Daiso started selling items priced at multiples of 100 yen, such as 200, 300, 400 or 500 yen.

Locations 
Daiso has 3,620 stores in Japan, and nearly 2,300 stores overseas in Australia, Bahrain, Brazil, Cambodia, Canada, China, Hong Kong, Indonesia, Kuwait, Macau, Malaysia, Mexico, Myanmar, New Zealand, Oman, Philippines, Qatar, Saudi Arabia, Singapore, South Korea, Taiwan, Thailand, United Arab Emirates, United States of America, and Vietnam.

Number of Daiso stores, as of 2023.

Australia
The first Daiso store opened up in Abbotsford, Victoria in 2010, selling thousands of items at a flat rate of $2.80. Since then it has expanded to thirteen stores in New South Wales, fourteen in Queensland, three in South Australia, twelve in Victoria and one in Perth (at Westfield Carousel). Almost every item is AUD $3.10, or US$, except for a small range of products (5% of total range) that is sold at varying prices from $3 to $15.

Bahrain
Daiso's main store in Bahrain is located at Dasman Center, Manama, and spans 2 floors. It has been in operation since 2005.
Daiso also runs a smaller outlet at Ramli Mall, A'ali. As of 2007, most products cost BHD 0.600, or US$.

Canada

Daiso opened its first corporate Canadian store on Granville Street in downtown Vancouver, British Columbia in April 2021, with plans to expand nationally. A new store is scheduled to open in the fall of 2022 in the Metrotown location.

A franchise store, owned by Fairchild Group, was operated in Richmond, British Columbia from 2003 to 2019, when it was rebranded under Fairchild's Oomomo banner. Oomomo has continued to sell some Daiso products, but this supply will be cut off as Daiso expands.

Cambodia
There are three locations of Daiso Japan in Cambodia. All products are priced at about US$1.90. As of 2018, its new name in Cambodia is ”DAISO JAPAN Life Coordinates Store”.

Malaysia
All products are priced at RM 5.90, or US$ GST-inclusive. The price increase from RM 5.30 to the current price was effective from March 1, 2017. The price temporarily reduced to RM 5.57 since there is no longer GST implemented in Malaysia, but returned to RM 5.90 again because of SST (Sales and Services Tax) that was effective from September 1, 2018.

Singapore
There are 27 Daiso stores in Singapore, together with 11 Threeppy stores and 1 Standard Products store. The minimum pricing is $2.14 and followed by 10 of the tiered increments.

South Korea
Daiso Korea owns 1,150 stores across the country, which was established in 1992 as the Daiso-Asung Corporation. Working in cooperation with Daiso Japan in 2001 (until 2011), the chain has proliferated over the last 10 years by using a low cost-high quality strategy. Daiso has an online shopping mall that allows people to purchase the same items at home.

In 2011 and 2014, Daiso Korea announced that they are no longer part of Daiso Japan; they claim that Daiso Japan was trying to promote Liancourt Rocks, as part of Japan. Daiso Korea confirmed that they were not selling the products Daiso Japan was selling and that they were acting as a different company.

Daiso Korea has a unique logo compared to the rest of the Daiso Corporation. The modified logo is used inside the country to rebrand itself as a more modern company and to show its break-off from Daiso Japan.

United States

On October 2, 2005, the first store in the United States opened for business in Alderwood Mall located in Lynnwood, Washington near Seattle, WA. This store is much smaller at only 442 square meters (approx. 4,750 square feet), and items were originally one of three prices, $1, $1.50, & $2 (all USD). The current inventory now includes packaged food and items are now priced up to $8, though most items are at the $1.50 price point.

There are 85 stores in the continental United States, operated by Daiso US. The stores are in California, Washington, Nevada, Texas, New Jersey, and New York. The largest U.S. Daiso is located in Union City, California, which has  of floor space and opened on August 8, 2007.

Additionally, there are four Daiso stores in Hawaii operated by Daiso Hawaii. On December 12, 2018, Daiso Japan opened its first store in Honolulu, Hawaii, and opened two others on March 14, 2019 and January 20, 2022.

On March 8, 2019, Daiso Japan opened its first branch on the U.S. East Coast in Flushing, Queens, New York.

On December 29, 2021, Daiso opened its first store in Las Vegas, Nevada.

Controversies
In June 2017 Daiso was forced by the Australian Competition & Consumer Commission to recall 165 products in Australia. These included toys which could pose a choking hazard or injury and beauty products with unknown ingredients.

In June 2022, Crocs filed a lawsuit against Daiso, accusing them of selling foam clogs that allegedly resembled theirs and violating copyright trademarks.

References

External links 

Discount stores of Japan
Companies based in Hiroshima Prefecture
Retail companies established in 1977
Retail companies of Japan
Variety stores
Japanese companies established in 1977